is a character popularized in Hokkaidō, Japan. Much like the Tamagotchi, the name "Marimokkori" is a portmanteau: marimo is the word for the green algae clusters that grow in some of Hokkaidō's lakes, while mokkori, literally "bulge", is a Japanese slang term for an erection.

Marimokkori's fame comes through merchandising, with a number of various souvenirs being sold in Hokkaidō and throughout Japan.

References 
 Anime News Service – January 18 – May 7 Anime News
 Japan Newbie – Hokkaidō Marimokkori

External links 
 Marimokkori.jp

Culture in Hokkaido